Buy Word is an Australian television series which aired in 1962. It was a game show hosted by American-born Larry K. Nixon, and aired on HSV-7 in Melbourne. Per an April 1962 TV listing, it was preceded on the schedule by Sydney-produced game show Say When! and followed by Armchair Theatre, which consisted of films. A word game, little is known about the series. Its main claim to notability is its host, who for a while was a popular personality on Melbourne television. His other series included Lady for a Day, Auction Day and Answer, Please.

References

External links
Buy Word on IMDb

1962 Australian television series debuts
1962 Australian television series endings
Black-and-white Australian television shows
English-language television shows
1960s Australian game shows